Spassky District is the name of several administrative and municipal districts in Russia. The name is generally derived from or related to the root "spas" ("savior")—usually alluding to the concept of the  Christian faith.
Spassky District, Nizhny Novgorod Oblast, an administrative and municipal district of Nizhny Novgorod Oblast
Spassky District, Penza Oblast, an administrative and municipal district of Penza Oblast
Spassky District, Primorsky Krai, an administrative and municipal district of Primorsky Krai
Spassky District, Ryazan Oblast, an administrative and municipal district of Ryazan Oblast
Spassky District, Republic of Tatarstan, an administrative and municipal district of the Republic of Tatarstan

See also
Spassky (disambiguation)
Spassk, name of several inhabited localities in Russia
Spas (disambiguation)

References